Liodytes is a genus of snakes in the subfamily Natricinae of the family Colubridae. The genus contains three species.

Geographic range
All species of the genus Liodytes are endemic to the southeastern United States.

Species
The following species are recognized as being valid.
Liodytes alleni  – striped crayfish snake
Liodytes pygaea  – black swamp snake
Liodytes rigida  – crayfish snake

Nota bene: A binomial authority in parentheses indicates that the species was originally described in a genus other than Liodytes.

References

Further reading
Cope ED (1885). "Twelfth Contribution to the Herpetology of Tropical America".  Proceedings of the American Philosophical Society, Philadelphia 22: 167–194. (Liodytes, new genus, p. 194).
Powell R, Conant R, Collins JT (2016). Peterson Field Guide to Reptiles and Amphibians of Eastern and Central North America, Fourth Edition. Boston and New York: Houghton Mifflin Harcourt. xiv + 494 pp., 47 plates, 207 figures. . (Genus Liodytes, p. 412).

 
Snake genera
Taxa named by Edward Drinker Cope